The National Handball Centre is an indoor handball facility located on the Croke Park campus in Dublin, Ireland. It is due to serve as both the national venue for All-Ireland Gaelic handball finals once it opens and as the headquarters of GAA Handball, the sport's national governing body. The new centre replaces the old Croke Park Handball Centre that was built in 1970.

As of January 2022, the centre had yet to be officially opened by GAA Handball, with the COVID-19 Pandemic delaying the centre's final stages of development. As of 2022, Ireland's national health service, the Health Service Executive was using the building for COVID-19 testing.

History
GAA Handball were granted planning approval in late 2017 to build a National Handball Centre at Croke Park.

The new National Handball Centre, located at the southeast corner of the stadium on Sackville Avenue, was close to completion as of January 2021, with the final minor stages of building delayed due to the COVID-19 pandemic. As of May 2020, the centre was being used for COVID-19 testing by Ireland's national health service, the Health Service Executive. As of early 2022, the centre had yet to be officially opened by GAA Handball, the GAA's sister organisation, which governs the sport of Gaelic handball.

Facilities
The new centre is planned to contain three 4-Wall handball courts - including a three-sided glass wall show court with amphitheatre style seating for a capacity of 500 spectators, a Softball show court with seating capacity for 200 spectators and three 1-Wall courts. The centre includes offices for GAA Handball staff, a bar and cafe as well as a community centre.

Official opening
While the centre's official opening was delayed due to both the COVID-19 pandemic as well as the final completion of remaining building works, the centre had a 'soft' opening in Spring 2022, allowing registered players to book the courts through Croke Park. The official opening of the centre was due to take place in December 2022, coinciding with the first ever European 1-Wall Tour "EliteStop" taking place on Saturday–Sunday, 10–11 December 2022. The event, organised by the GAA in partnership with the European 1-Wall Tour, was expected to be livestreamed, with the finals broadcast live on Irish television.

Ownership and operation
The National Handball Centre building and the site it occupies are owned by Páirc an Chrócaigh Teoranta, the firm that oversees the running of Croke Park. The centre is expected to be managed and operated by a joint venture company under a long-term lease. This company comprises a partnership between the GAA and the 'Irish Handball Sports Centre', a local community group. According to the GAA, "its primary purpose is the promotion of handball" and "it can never be repurposed" or "changed in any way or indeed sold without GAA consent".

References

Croke Park
Gaelic games grounds in the Republic of Ireland
Sports venues in Dublin (city)
Sports venues completed in 2021
2021 establishments in Ireland
21st-century architecture in the Republic of Ireland